Kalakand is a semi-solid milk sweet from India. It is made with paneer, full-fat milk, sugar, and cardamom powder that is topped with nuts. This dish is usually served cut into individual servings that are usually square shaped. This sweet is hugely popular in the Indian Mithai shops.

Kalakand was invented in 1947 by Baba Thakur Das, in Alwar, Rajasthan. In the 1950s, the dessert came to Jhumri Telaiya, where the Bhatia brothers (who had migrated from Pakistan after the partition) made another, creamy version. This version became popular in present-day Bihar and Jharkhand.

See also
List of Indian sweets and desserts
List of Pakistani sweets and desserts

References

Indian desserts
Pakistani desserts
Cheese dishes
Rajasthani desserts